The Don Carlos Palanca Memorial Awards for Literature, popularly known as the Palanca Awards, are a set of literary awards for Philippine writers. Usually referred to as the "Pulitzer Prize of the Philippines", it is the country's highest literary honor in terms of prestige. Winning works are entered in the competition either as previously published pieces or in manuscript form. The Palanca Awards, organized by the Carlos Palanca Foundation, is one of the Philippines' longest-running awards programs.

It was named after Carlos Palanca Sr.

History
Palanca Awards was established in 1950 to inspire and recognize Philippine writers, including poets, playwrights and screenwriters, and writers for children. In the 1960s, the Palanca Awards Committee started to fund the publication of Palanca Award-winning plays, and production funds were committed in 1975. In 2009, it added a category for poetry for children, in both Tagalog and English.

Categories 
Starting on the 60th awards year, for which the call for submissions opened on March 1, 2010 (ended April 30, 2010), contestants could submit one entry each in the following categories:

English division 
 Short story
 Short story for children
 Essay
 Poetry
 Poetry written for children
 One-act play
 Full-length play

Filipino division
 Maikling Kuwento (Short story in Filipino)
 Maikling Kuwentong Pambata (Short story for children in Filipino)
 Sanaysay (Essay in Filipino)
 Tula (Poetry in Filipino)
 Tulang Isinulat Para sa mga Bata (Poetry for children in Filipino)
 Dulang May Isang Yugto (One-act play in Filipino)
 Dulang Ganap ang Haba (Full-length play in Filipino)
 Dulang Pampelikula (Screenplay in Filipino)

Regional languages division 
 Short story in Cebuano
 Short story in Hiligaynon
 Short story in Iluko

Kabataan division (Open only to those below 18 years of age)
 Kabataan essay
 Kabataan sanaysay

Palanca Hall of Fame
The Palanca Hall of Fame honors was established in 1995 and is presented to a Palanca awardee who already won five first prizes in the regular categories.

2012
Peter Solis Nery

2008
 Reuel Molina Aguila
 Eugene Y. Evasco

2007
 Nicolas B. Pichay

2006
 Rodolfo Lana Jr.

2005
 Luis P. Gatmaitan, M.D.
 Manuel Buising

2004
 Isagani R. Cruz

2003
 Reynaldo A. Duque

2001
 Leoncio P. Deriada
 Alfred A. Yuson

2000
 Roberto T. Añonuevo
 Jose Y. Dalisay Jr.
 Edgardo B. Maranan

1999
 Elsa Martinez Coscolluela

1996
 Ma. Luisa Aguilar Igloria

1995
 Cirilo Bautista
 Gregorio C. Brillantes
 Ruth Elynia S. Mabanglo
 Buenaventura S. Medina Jr.
 Jesus T. Peralta
 Rolando Tinio
 Rene Villanueva

See also

References

External links
The Official Carlos Palanca Awards website

 
Philippine literary awards
Awards established in 1950
1950 establishments in the Philippines